The Houston Heights Fire Station is a building located at 12th Street and Yale Street in Houston Heights, Houston, Texas.  It was listed on the National Register of Historic Places in 1983. It is located in block #186.

It is a  building constructed as Houston Heights' city hall and jail, and fire station in 1914. After annexation, it served as a city of Houston fire station from 1918 until 1995.  It was Fire Station 14.  The Houston Heights Association took a 30-year lease on the property from the city and refurbished the property. By December 2009 the former city hall was for sale.

See also
 National Register of Historic Places listings in Harris County, Texas

References

1914 establishments in Texas
Buildings and structures in Houston
Fire stations completed in 1914
Fire stations on the National Register of Historic Places in Texas
Jacobean architecture in the United States
National Register of Historic Places in Houston
Tudor Revival architecture in Texas
Houston Heights